Al-Izza Sport Club, is an Iraqi football team based in Wasit, that plays in Iraq Division Three.

Managerial history
  Hassan Naeem
  Majed Al-Badri
  Haider Ibrahim
  Ali Jawad Al-Aboudi

See also 
 2021–22 Iraq Division Three

References

External links
 Al-Izza SC on Goalzz.com
 Iraq Clubs- Foundation Dates

1967 establishments in Iraq
Association football clubs established in 1967
Football clubs in Wasit